Charles de Lorraine  (8 April 1648 – 13 November 1708) was the Count of Marsan. He was the youngest son of the Count of Harcourt and brother of the Chevalier de Lorraine.

Biography
Charles was the youngest son of Henri de Lorraine, Count of Harcourt and Marguerite Philippe du Cambout. As a member of the House of Guise, a cadet branch of the House of Lorraine, he was a Foreign Prince at the Court of France. The youngest son, he was given an appanage in the form of the County of Marsan at birth. At his death, it was given to his eldest son Charles Louis. The latter was also known as the Prince of Pons.

The youngest of six children, five sons and one daughter, his siblings included Louis, Count of Armagnac, Grand Squire of France and the bisexual Chevalier de Lorraine, lover of Philippe I, Duke of Orléans. His other brothers were Abbots of Royaumont (Alfonse Louis) and Faron de Meaux (Raimond Bérenger).

Madame de Sévigné referred to him as le petit Marsan.

At the age of 35, he married "Catherine" Thérèse de Goyon de Matignon a daughter of Henri Goyon and Marie Françoise Le Tellier, herself a sister of François Michel Le Tellier de Louvois. She was an aunt of Jacques I, Prince of Monaco. Madame de Sévigné noted that he married Catherine for the fortune she had been left by her later husband.

Catherine was previously married to Jean-Baptiste Colbert de Seignelay, son of Jean Baptiste Colbert, and was already the mother of four children. The couple were married on 22 September 1696 and had three children, two of whom survived infancy. Catherine died in childbirth with her last child, a daughter named Marie who died some 9 days after birth. Charles never married again.

He was created a knight of the Order of the Holy Spirit, the most prestigious military knighthood of the Ancien Régime, on 31 December 1688 at Versailles. His two brothers, Louis and Philippe, were also created members of the order on the same day.

Charles died in Paris at the age of 60.

His last male line descendant was Camille, Prince of Marsan, brother of the last Count of Marsan. His last female line descendant, through his granddaughter "Louise" Henriette Gabrielle (Duchess of Bouillon by marriage) was her only surviving son Jacques Léopold de La Tour d'Auvergne, the last Duke of Bouillon. He has no known descendants.

Issue
Charles Louis de Lorraine, Count of Marsan, Prince of Pons (21 October 1696 – 2 November 1755) married Élisabeth de Roquelaure and had issue;
Jacques Henri de Lorraine, Chevalier de Lorraine (24 March 1698 – 2 June 1734) married Anne Marguerite Gabrielle de Beauvau had no issue; died in the Siege of Philippsburg.
Marie de Lorraine (7 December 1699 – 16 December 1699) died in infancy.

Ancestry

References and notes

1648 births
1708 deaths
House of Guise
House of Lorraine
18th-century French people
17th-century French people
Counts of Marsan
Princes of Lorraine